Pyry Kärkkäinen (born 10 November 1986) is a Finnish professional footballer who plays as a centre-back for Kakkonen club PPJ.

Club career
Kärkkäinen started his career with Kiuruveden Palloilijat where he played, until joining PK-37 for the season 2003. In 2003, he went on trial at Molde FK. For the season 2004, he moved to Kuopio and KuPS. He signed for three years. KuPS was relegated in 2006 and Kärkkäinen left the club and signed with FC Lahti. At that time he was already a regular in the Finnish under-19 national team. FC Honka had Kärkkäinen at trial in 2006, but chose not to offer a contract and FC Lahti's coach Antti Muurinen signed him for the first time.

In November 2008, Kärkkäinen signed a two-year contract with the capital city club HJK. Also in this time Muurinen wanted to have the talented centre-back. He made his first appearance for HJK in the 5–1 home win against his former club KuPS on 18 April 2009. He also scored his first goal for HJK in the same match.

After having played for Lahti between 2013 and 2017, Kärkkäinen took a career break. He returned to football in 2021, signing with recently promoted third-tier Kakkonen club PPJ.

International career
He was a part of the Finland U21s, that qualified  for the UEFA European Under-21 Football Championship in 2009. He has also played for U17's and U19's.

Honours
KuPS
 Finnish League Cup: 2006

Lahti
 Finnish League Cup: 2007

HJK Helsinki
 Veikkausliiga: 2009, 2010

References

External links
 
 Profile at HJK.fi
 Guardian Football
 Stats at Veikkausliiga.com

1986 births
Living people
People from Kiuruvesi
Finnish footballers
Association football central defenders
Veikkausliiga players
Kakkonen players
Kuopion Palloseura players
FC Lahti players
Helsingin Jalkapalloklubi players
Finland youth international footballers
Finland under-21 international footballers
Pallo-Kerho 37 players
Sportspeople from North Savo